Tigelaar is a Dutch surname. Notable people with the surname include:

Ineke Tigelaar (born 1945), Dutch swimmer 
Liz Tigelaar (born 1975), American television writer, producer, and author

Dutch-language surnames